Handball Federation of India was founded by Jagat Singh Lohan from Rohtak, Haryana, who was an alumnus of YMCA College of Physical Education of Madras. His efforts during Munich Olympics helped in establishing HFI. The member states were Andhra Pradesh, Uttar Pradesh, Haryana, Vidharbha and Jammu and Kashmir. He was also elected as first secretary general of Handball Federation of India.

The first senior men's national handball championship was held at Sir Chhotu Ram Stadium, Rohtak, in 1972.

Performance at Asian championships
Due to huge efforts of the HFI administrators, India started participating in the Asian Men's Handball Championship in 1979 and the Asian Women's Handball Championship in 1993. Though the teams were yet to win a medal, participation brought important experience for players and coaching staff.

Performance at Asian Games
Indian men's handball team first participated in the Asian Games in 1982 when the event was hosted in New Delhi. Women's team debuted in the event 2006 held at Doha.

Performance at South Asian Games
Indian men's handball team is the second best team of Asian Games, after Pakistan. Men's team debuted in 2010 and won silver medal, losing to Pakistan in the final by 37–31. In the 2016 edition, India got their revenge when they hosted the event in Guwahati, narrowly defeating Pakistan by 32–31. In the 2019 edition, Pakistan dethroned India beating them in Kathmandu by 30–29.

Indian women's handball team is the best team of South Asia, winning both editions of the South Asian Games in 2016 and 2019, defeating Bangladesh and hosts Nepal respectively.

Handball leaders
Since the foundation of handball and Handball Federation of India (HFI), many government officials and other renowned personalities were involved in it. They not only represented handball in the Indian Olympic Association, but also at international level. One of these is HFI president Dr. Roshan Lal Anand, the longest serving director of National Institute of Sports. Anand was elected as Secretary General of Asian Handball Federation (2000 - 2013) unopposed for continuously 13 years. He was also elected as IOA Secretary General.

Dr. Surinder Mohan Bali, who is the longest serving HFI secretary general, was elected as member of AHF Marketing Commission. Bali become the first Indian who was awarded with IHF Badge of Merit in Gold for his contributions to the development of handball, by the International Handball Federation during the 2009 IHF Congress held in Cairo (Egypt). Bali is also a member of Executive council of the Indian Olympic Association.

Dr. Anandeshwar Panday, who is current HFI secretary general, was elected as member of AHF Commission of Organizing and Competition and treasurer of Indian Olympic Association in 2017.
Following is the list of HFI administrators who also hold other prominent positions:

References

External links

 
Handball